The MS Aqua Jewel is a Greek passenger car ferry, which is part of the fleet of SeaJets Ferries. She was built in 2003 in Perama, Attica and was put into service at SeaJets in 2017 (She had previously been operated by other companies). The ship initially belonged to the shipowner Georgios Perogiannakis and in 2010 she was chartered by the Shipping Company of Lesvos - NEL Lines. Since 2017, she belongs to SeaJets, which occasionally charters her to Atlanticoline. She no longer holds this record, since the construction of Hellenic Seaways' -long Nissos Mykonos (now ). The Aqua Jewel was intended as a mega-yacht named Nyssilos, while the initial cost was about 25,000,000 US dollars. Aqua Jewel facilities include two bars, a hospital and a helipad.

Designing and construction 
The ship was originally intended for a large yacht named Nysilos, which began construction in the early 1990s, with a capacity of 80 passengers and a cost of about $25 million, but was never completed due to foreclosure, as its owner was in debt, and so in 1998 she was finally bought by Alpha Ferries of Georgios Perogiannakis and converted into a passenger/vehicle ferry with its current name. Although large sums of money were allocated for her safety, she had several problems due to her construction, which affected his later career. The use of aluminum on the shared decks made her quite light, while its small draft negatively affected the trip in bad weather conditions. Although the bow propeller was a waterjet type, something that was considered an innovation, it was quite weak. She was finally completed in September 2002.

Characteristics 
Aqua Jewel has three ramps (two for vehicles and one for passengers), a main garage for vehicles, as well as "vehicle lofts", which are used mainly on the local route Gythio-Kythira-Antikythira-Kissamos . For passengers, she has escalators, living room, reception, 60 air-type seats, two lounges with tables, seats and sofas, two bars, playground, open decks, 15 outdoor double cabins, 2 LUX cabins, as well as a hospital, a VIP room, a clothing store and special areas for the disabled. In total, she has 8 decks.

Technical aspects 
It has two rudders for flexibility in difficult ports and has pairs of stabilizers for sailing in rough seas.

Service history 
The original plans were to launch the Cyclades mainland lines as a subsidy, but the proposal was rejected and so, in the spring of 2003 it was launched between Rafina-Andros-Tinos-Mykonos, with Captain Isidoros Mamidis as the captain.

Refits, NEL Lines charter and laid-up 
In view of all the above problems, the shipowner decided to make some improvements to the ship in order to increase its reliability. In 2004, the bow was converted into a bulbous bow, but that was not enough to solve her problems. In 2006, a new exterior was added to deck 7, in 2007 a second rudder was added and the fuel was changed from marine diesel to marine fuel and in 2008 awnings were placed atop the bridge. In 2009, she stopped from her usual routes and in February 2010 it was launched between Lavrio-Agios Efstratios-Lemnos-Kavala. In November 2014, she was laid-up in Drapetsona, due to a failure of the left engine.

Return to service 
While the ship was laid-up, she could not be repaired, although NEL Lines assured the Ministry of Shipping to the contrary, while there were debts of the accrued 20 crew members, which remained unsecured.  In 2015, with the dissolution of NEL, she was transferred to the Tsagarinou shipyards in Perama, Attica and returned to Alpha Ferries, but it never managed to be utilized, although the shipowner planned to launch it between Volos-Skiathos-Skopelos-Alonissos.  In mid-2017, she was purchased by SeaJets to replace the Aqua Spirit. Finally, she returned to operational condition and on 18 August 2017 she started operating. During the 2018 and 2019 summers, she was chartered in the Azores for Atlanticoline, while in March 2020 she was launched on the Piraeus-Kythira-Antikythira-Kissamos-Gythio line.

References

External links 
 Aqua Jewel on alphaferries.gr (5/12/2017, Greek)
 Aqua Jewel on nel.gr (3/11/2016)

Ferries of Greece
Ships built in Greece